Kent Townley (January 18, 1930 – May 26, 2005) was an American wrestler. He competed in the men's Greco-Roman bantamweight at the 1956 Summer Olympics.

References

1930 births
2005 deaths
American male sport wrestlers
Olympic wrestlers of the United States
Wrestlers at the 1956 Summer Olympics
Sportspeople from Sioux City, Iowa